This is a list of diving facilities, especially those including 10-meter diving platforms.  This is usually the last feature of an athletics complex required for training and competition in the full program of Olympic swimming and diving.  In the United States, a 10-meter platform is required for full NCAA competition, although two schools may hold a dual NCAA meet at a facility lacking one if both schools agree.  Organizations that set standards for diving facilities include FINA which governs international competitions, and, in the United States, NFHS, NCAA, and USA Swimming. A typical requirement for indoor facilities is that they must provide  clearance above the highest diving board or platform, so that divers do not hit a ceiling structure.

The competitive sport of diving has included the 10-meter dive as an Olympic event since the 1904 Summer Olympics.  By 1837, six indoor pools with diving boards had been built in London, England.  The first diving competition was held in 1885, in Germany.
In the first Olympic diving competition in 1904, American George Sheldon won gold in platform diving.  Women's diving in the Olympics started with Women's diving at the 1912 Summer Olympics, won by Greta Johansson.

Training for Olympic diving competition requires 10-meter diving facilities, which are scant in some parts of the world. For example, the Walter Schroeder Aquatic Center, built in 1979 as a YMCA facility, is one of only two Olympic-sized pools in Wisconsin that can host large events, and it is the only facility in the southeast Wisconsin region with 10-meter diving platforms.

Australia 

Constructed in the lead-up to the 1956 Melbourne Olympic Games, this was the first 10 meter diving platform in Australia.

Austria 

Auster Wellnessbad / Graz Eggenberg, Graz, Austria

Brazil

Centro Aquático Maria Lenk (built 2007), host of diving events of 2007 Pan American Games and of 2016 Summer Olympics.  Now part of the Rio de Janeiro Olympic Park.

Canada
Bassin de plongeon, Olympic Park (Montreal), host of diving for 1972 Summer Olympics, "complètement modernisé".

France
Piscine des Tourelles, Paris, aquatics venue for the 1924 Summer Olympics.

Germany

Olympic Swimming Stadium, Berlin, which hosted the 1936 Summer Olympics's swimming and diving competitions.

Others:

Hungary

High diving facility in Budapest
Alfréd Hajós National Swimming Stadium, Budapest
Danube Arena, Budapest
Debrecen Swimming Pool Complex, Debrecen

India
Diving pool at Mahatma Gandhi Swimming Pool, Dadar West, Mumbai, is a separate  diving pool with 1m and 3m boards, 5m, 7.5m and 10m platforms.

Monaco
Rainier III Nautical Stadium, whose saltwater Olympic-size swimming pool has 1, 3, 5, and 10m diving platforms.

Netherlands

Eindhoven, host of diving for 2008 European Cup (athletics) (mainly in France)
Olympic Sports Park Swim Stadium, Amsterdam, aquatics venue for 1928 Summer Olympics, demolished following the Olympics in 1929.

Norway

Ankerskogen svømmehall, in Hamar, Hedmark
Oslo

Sweden

Lysingsbadet, Västervik, diving platforms of two heights

Switzerland

Bellerive, Lausanne

Hallenbad Oerlikon (Zurich), with diving boards and platforms at 1/3/5/7.5/10 meters of height.

United States
Notable historic facilities in the United States, which are no longer existing, include:
Diving platforms and springboards at the salt-water, public Fleishhacker Pool in San Francisco.  The facility opened in 1925 and was closed in 1971.

Current facilities include:

See also
List of swimming pools in Hungary
List of swimming pools in Sweden

References

Diving in the United States
Lists of sports venues in the United States
Diving (sport)-related lists